North Shore Community College is a public community college in Massachusetts with campuses in Danvers, and Lynn. The college offers over 80 associate degree and certificate programs to approximately 10,000 students a year from the 26 cities and towns along the coastal region from north metropolitan Boston to Cape Ann. North Shore Community College is accredited by the New England Commission of Higher Education.

See also
List of colleges and universities in Massachusetts

References

External links
Official website

Community colleges in Massachusetts
Educational institutions established in 1965
Universities and colleges in Essex County, Massachusetts
1965 establishments in Massachusetts